Supremacy is the fourth studio album by American metalcore band Hatebreed. It is their first and only release with Roadrunner Records. The album was released on August 29, 2006. The track, "To the Threshold", earlier appeared on the album, MTV2 Headbangers Ball: The Revenge, released in April 2006.

Frontman Jamey Jasta contends that the main theme of Supremacy is overcoming "feelings of depression, guilt, sadness, anxiety, alienation. I wanted to show that there is hope, and you have to start with yourself. You can't help other people if you can't help yourself."

Track listing

Bonus tracks
"New Hate Rising" (non-CD track, available exclusively through iTunes, Masters Of Horror II soundtrack) - 2:36
"Pollution of the Soul" (available exclusively through MTV/Urge, Japanese bonus track, also released on self-titled album) - 2:56
"Severed" (UK edition bonus track) - 2:43

Credits

Musicians
Jamey Jasta - vocals
Sean Martin - lead guitar
Frank Novinec - rhythm guitar
Chris Beattie - bass
Matt Byrne - drums
Brendan Feeney - backing vocals
Josh Grden - backing vocals
Patrick Sullivan - backing vocals

Production
Zeuss - producer, engineer, mixing
Mike Gitter - A&R
Ted Jensen - mastering
Heather Baker - violin
Meran Karanitant - artwork, layout design
Daragh McDonagh - photography

Charts

References 

2006 albums
Hatebreed albums
Roadrunner Records albums
Albums produced by Chris "Zeuss" Harris